Mibefradil (trade name Posicor) was a pharmaceutical drug used for the treatment of hypertension and chronic angina pectoris. It is a nonselective calcium channel blocker. It was voluntary pulled from the market ten months after FDA approval, citing potential serious health hazards shown in post release studies.

The mechanism of action of mibefradil is characterized by the selective blockade of transient, low-voltage-activated (T-type) calcium channels over long-lasting, high-voltage-activated (L-type) calcium channels, which is probably responsible for many of its unique properties.

On June 8, 1998, Roche announced the voluntary withdrawal of the drug from the market, one year after approval by the FDA, due to the potential for drug interactions, some of them deadly, which may occur when it is taken together with some other medications.

Synthesis

References

Amines
Benzimidazoles
Calcium channel blockers
CYP2D6 inhibitors
CYP3A4 inhibitors
Ethers
Isopropyl compounds
Fluoroarenes
Tetralins
Withdrawn drugs